Marivani-ye Bidgoli (also Romanized as Marīvānī-ye Bīdgolī; also known as Marīvānī-ye Bīdgol) is a village in Haft Ashiyan Rural District, Kuzaran District, Kermanshah County, Kermanshah Province, Iran. At the 2006 census, its population was 151, in 38 families.

References 

Populated places in Kermanshah County